Poling Preceptory was a priory in West Sussex, England.

References

Monasteries in West Sussex